Rajsitapur is a Village in Dhrangadhra Block in Surendranagar District of Gujarat, India. It is located 18 km north of the district headquarters Surendranagar.

Rajsitapur Pin code is 363320 and the postal head office is Rajsitapur.

It is the center of many villages like Bharad, Hampur, Prathugadh, pratappur, Dumana, etc. There is beautiful step-well on main road in Rajsitapur.

Although it is a village there  all facility are available like Hospital, vegetable Market, pond, water facility, commute to any village any time.

Notable places:
1. Fuleswar Mahadev Temple
2. Ambaji Temple
3. beautiful Lake
4. Lalaji Maharaj Temple
5. Jain Derasar (made by Jashaji Limbad)

Taluka Name: Dhrangadhra District: Surendranagar State: Gujarat Language: Gujarati Time zone: IST (UTC+5:30) Elevation / Altitude: 54 meters. Above Sea level Telephone Code / Std Code: 02754

Notable people from Rajsitapur are Manubhai Gadhavi, Sanjay Gadhavi (Dhoom 1 & 2 movie director), Dr. Surani (Safalta Koino Ijaro Nathi well known book writer), Gopalbhai Barot (well-known Sahitykar)

The Population Census of 2011 found 771 families residing in the Rajsitapur Village with 3701 people of which 1936 are males while 1765 are females. The predominant religion is Hindu.

As per the constitution of India and Panchyati Raaj Act, Rajsitapur village is administrated by Sarpanch (Head of Village) who is the elected representative of village.

References

Villages in Surendranagar district